"You Don't Love Me Anymore" is a song written by Alan Ray and Jeff Raymond, and recorded by American country music artist Eddie Rabbitt.  It was released in May 1978 as the second single from the album Variations.  The song was Rabbitt's second number one on the country chart.  The single stayed at number one for one week and spent a total of ten weeks on the country chart.

Chart performance

References

1978 singles
1978 songs
Eddie Rabbitt songs
Song recordings produced by David Malloy
Elektra Records singles